Ronald McHenry (born January 21, 1962) is an American former college women's basketball coach at Washburn University. During his 22 seasons at Washburn, he led the Ichabods to one national championship, seven conference regular season and tournament championships, and twelve NCAA tournament appearances. Prior to his current post, McHenry served as an assistant coach at a local high school, assistant and interim head coach for the Topeka Sizzlers for one season, assistant coach for the Washburn men's basketball program, as well as the men's golf coach at Washburn for eight seasons.

Career

Early coaching career 
Born on January 21, 1962, in Olathe, Kansas, McHenry began his college basketball career as a player for the Coffeyville Red Ravens and Kansas Jayhawks before finishing his college career at Washburn University. After graduating from Washburn, McHenry served as a graduate assistant for the Ichabods for one season before landing a teaching and assistant coaching job at Perry-Lecompton High School. In 1988, McHenry served as the assistant coach and interim head coach for the Topeka Sizzlers of the Continental Basketball Association. After a season with the Sizzlers, McHenry returned to his alma mater as an assistant coach under Bob Chipman.

Washburn University 
In May 2000, McHenry was announced as the next women's basketball coach at Washburn. During his time at Washburn, McHenry has posted a  overall record,  conference record, and has won eight conference regular season championships, seven conference tournament championships, and one NCAA Division II Tournament championship.

He retired after the 2021–22 season.

Head coach record

References

External links
 Washburn profile

1962 births
Living people
American men's basketball players
American women's basketball coaches
Basketball coaches from Kansas
Washburn Ichabods men's basketball players
Washburn Ichabods men's basketball coaches
Washburn Ichabods women's basketball coaches
Washburn University alumni
Wichita State University alumni
Sportspeople from Olathe, Kansas